Génesis Cabrera (born October 10, 1996) is a Dominican professional baseball pitcher for the St. Louis Cardinals of Major League Baseball (MLB). He made his MLB debut in 2019.

Career

Tampa Bay Rays
Cabrera signed with the Tampa Bay Rays as an international free agent in November 2013. He made his professional debut in 2014 with the Dominican Summer League Rays, going 2–1 with a 2.45 earned run average (ERA) in  innings pitched. In 2015, he played for the Princeton Rays where he pitched only 17 innings, and in 2016, he pitched with the Bowling Green Hot Rods, with whom he was named a Midwest League All-Star, going 11–5 with a 3.88 ERA in 23 games (22 starts). He spent 2017 with both the Charlotte Stone Crabs and the Montgomery Biscuits, compiling a combined 9–9 record and 3.22 ERA in 25 games (24 starts) between both teams, and he began 2018 back with Montgomery where he was named to the Southern League All-Star Game.

St. Louis Cardinals
On July 31, 2018, the Rays traded Cabrera, Justin Williams and Roel Ramírez to the St. Louis Cardinals for Tommy Pham. He was assigned to the Springfield Cardinals before being promoted to the Memphis Redbirds for the playoffs. In 27 games (25 starts) between Montgomery, Springfield, and Memphis, he went 8–9 with a 4.17 ERA and a 1.32 WHIP.

The Cardinals added Cabrera to their 40-man roster after the 2018 season. He began the 2019 season with Memphis. He was promoted to the major leagues for the first time on May 29, 2019. He made his debut that night in a start versus the Philadelphia Phillies, giving up five runs (three earned) over  innings, striking out five and walking two in an eventual 11–4 Cardinals loss. He made one more start before being reassigned back to Memphis. He was recalled to St. Louis once again on June 13, and optioned back to Memphis on June 24. He was recalled to St. Louis once again on August 31, finishing the season there. Over  innings pitched with St. Louis during the regular season, Cabrera went 0–2 with a 4.87 ERA and 19 strikeouts.

In a shortened 2020 season, Cabrera recorded a 2.42 ERA with 32 strikeouts over  innings of work while raising his whiff rate from 18.1% in 2019 to 40.3%. In 2021, Cabrera emerged as a key member of the Cardinals' bullpen, appearing in 71 games in which he went 4–5 with a 3.73 ERA and 77 strikeouts over seventy innings.

Cabrera was suspended for one game in the aftermath of a benches-clearing incident between the Cardinals and New York Mets on April 27, 2022.

References

External links

1996 births
Living people
Dominican Republic expatriate baseball players in the United States
Sportspeople from Santo Domingo
Major League Baseball players from the Dominican Republic
Major League Baseball pitchers
St. Louis Cardinals players
Dominican Summer League Rays players
Princeton Rays players
Bowling Green Hot Rods players
Charlotte Stone Crabs players
Montgomery Biscuits players
Springfield Cardinals players
Memphis Redbirds players
Tigres del Licey players
2023 World Baseball Classic players